Tombu may refer to:
 Tombu-e Bala ("Upper Tombu"), Minab County, Hormozgan Province, Iran
 Tombu-e Pain ("Lower Tombu"), Minab County, Hormozgan Province, Iran
 Tombu Jonubi ("South Tombu"), Parsian County, Hormozgan Province, Iran
 Tombu Shomali ("North Tombu"), Parsian County, Hormozgan Province, Iran

See also
 Tomb, Iran (disambiguation)